Pterulicium is a genus of fungi in the Pterulaceae family. The genus was previously monotypic, containing the single species Pterulicium xylogenum, found in southeast Asia. However in 2020 a major reclassification of the Pterulaceae family occurred based on phylogenetic analysis and the Pterula genus was split into Pterula, Myrmecopterula, Pterulicium and Phaeopterula by the mycologists Caio A. Leal-Dutra, Bryn Tjader Mason Dentinger and Gareth W. Griffith.

Species 
, Species Fungorum accepted 42 species of Pterulicum.

References

External links
 

Pterulaceae
Fungi of Asia
Monotypic Agaricales genera